Alex Helm (1920-1970) was an award-winning British Folklorist, described as "one of the most important figures in the study of calendar custom and [folk] dance in post-war England".

Early life and education 
Helm was born in Burnley, Lancashire, in 1920, becoming interested in folk dancing whilst attending Burnley Grammar School. He trained to become a teacher at St John's Teacher-training College, York.

During the Second World War he served in the Indian Army Ordnance Corps, reaching the rank of Major.

Career 
After the war, Helm taught at Northumberland Heath Secondary School, Erith, before in 1949 moving to Danesford School at Congleton, Cheshire.

Folklore Research 
Helm began to take an interest in the history of dances and dramatic traditions of Lancashire and Cheshire, in part influenced by Margaret Dean-Smith, Librarian of the English Folk Dance and Song Society (EFDSS), with whom Helm had helped to sort and index the Society's papers.  Within a year of his move to Cheshire he had published research on ‘The Cheshire Soul-caking Play’, a type of folk play that had been little studied.

During this period Helm, now a member of the Manchester Morris Men troupe, also began to research Lancastrian Morris traditions.

Helm joined the Folklore Society in 1954.  He soon made a study of the papers of T. F. Ordish, held in the collections of the Society. Ordish, a 19th century folklorist who specialised on mummers' plays, had planned – but never completed – a monograph on British folk drama.

Inspired by this work, Helm’s research expanded from folk dance and folk play into creating a geographical index of British seasonal customs, of which folk dance and folk play would form sections.  For this project he worked with a group of researchers - E.C. Cawte, Norman Peacock and Roger Marriott. The group co-authored 'A Geographical Index of the Ceremonial Dance in Great Britain', which was published as two journal articles in 1960 and 1961  and English Ritual Drama: A Geographical Index in 1967.

English Ritual Drama is now seen as a seminal work, being the "first systematic attempt to list every known occurrence of the folk play in Britain and to provide a source for each location".

Recognition and influence 
In 1968 Helm was awarded the Coote Lake Medal of the Folklore Society, for "outstanding research and scholarship" in the field of Folklore Studies.  Whilst never a field collector, he was hailed for his "great ability to interest and stimulate others, and to guide them with his deep and growing knowledge",

Helm died in 1970: his life and work being "cut short as he reached his peak".

Helm had a considerable influence on later customs researchers in England, particularly through the geographic approach he advocated. His argument that folk dance and folk play should be studied as rituals or customs - as opposed to the literary approach adopted by earlier scholars like E. K. Chambers - became the adopted model (although one criticised by later researchers).

Helm's research papers - including correspondence, manuscript notebooks and working papers for his research on seasonal customs - are now held in the Special Collections of UCL.

Selected publications 
Helm, Alex (1950). "The Cheshire Soul-Caking Play". Journal of the English Folk Dance and Song Society. 6 (2): 45–50. 

Helm, Alex (1954). "The Rushcart and the North-Western Morris". Journal of the English Folk Dance and Song Society. 7 (3): 172–179. 

Helm, Alex (1955-09-01). "Report on the Ordish Papers". Folklore. 66 (3): 360–362.  

Cawte, E. C.; Helm, Alex; Marriott, R. J.; Peacock, N. (1960). "A Geographical Index of the Ceremonial Dance in Great Britain: Part One". Journal of the English Folk Dance and Song Society. 9 (1): ii–41. 

Cawte, E. C.; Helm, Alex; Peacock, N. (1961). "A Geographical Index of the Ceremonial Dance in Great Britain: Addenda and Corrigenda". Journal of the English Folk Dance and Song Society. 9 (2): 93–95. 

Helm, Alex (1965-06-01). "In Comes I, St George". Folklore. 76 (2): 118–136.  

Cawte, E. C; Helm, Alex; Peacock, N (1967). English ritual drama: a geographical index,. London: Folk-lore Society.  {{OCLC}124592}}

Helm, Alex (1981). The English mummers' play: With a foreword by N. Peacock and E.C. Cawte. Woodbridge, Suffolk: Brewer.

References 

1920 births
1970 deaths
British folklorists
People from Burnley
People educated at Burnley Grammar School
Military personnel of British India
British people in colonial India